Dupjachani is a village in the municipality of Dolneni, North Macedonia.

Demographics
According to the 2021 census, the village had a total of 127 inhabitants. Ethnic groups in the village include:

Macedonians 124
Albanians 1
Other 2

References

Villages in Dolneni Municipality